The Ayacucho thistletail (Asthenes ayacuchensis) is a species of bird in the family Furnariidae. It is endemic to northern Ayacucho, Peru.

Its natural habitats are subtropical or tropical moist montane forest and subtropical or tropical high-altitude grassland.

This species was at one time considered to be a subspecies of the Vilcabamba thistletail (Asthenes vilcabambae). A phylogenetic study published in 2015 that examined both DNA sequence data and vocalization recordings of members of the genus Asthenes found that the Ayacucho thistletail was more similar to the eye-ringed thistletail than it was to the Vilcabamba thistletail. Based on this evidence the subspecies was elevated to species rank.

References

Ayacucho thistletail
Birds of the Peruvian Andes
Ayacucho thistletail
Ayacucho thistletail
Ayacucho thistletail
Ayacucho thistletail